Love Has Come for You is a 2013 bluegrass music CD featuring a collaboration of 13 original songs composed by Steve Martin (music) and Edie Brickell (music and lyrics). The album cover art is a painting entitled "After Dinner Drinks" (2008) by Martin Mull; the original work is in Steve Martin's personal art collection. 
Produced by Peter Asher, the album features musical appearances by bassist Esperanza Spalding, fiddlers Nicky Sanders and Sara Watkins, and guitarist Waddy Wachtel.  Backing vocals and instrumental accompaniment were also performed by all contemporaneous members of the band Steep Canyon Rangers who would tour extensively with Martin and Brickell following the record release.

Altered versions of "When You Get to Asheville" and "Sun's Gonna Shine" later appeared in Martin and Brickell's 2014 musical, Bright Star.

Track listing 

"When You Get to Asheville" – 3:15
"Get Along Stray Dog" – 2:10
"Love Has Come for You" – 3:08
"Friend of Mine" – 2:36
"Siamese Cat" – 2:57
"Yes She Did" – 1:34
"Sarah Jane and the Iron Mountain Baby" – 3:12
"Fighter" – 2:40
"King of Boys" – 2:51
"Sun's Gonna Shine" – 3:05
"Who You Gonna Take?" – 2:41
"Shawnee" – 2:29
"Remember Me This Way" – 3:31

Commercial performance

The album debuted at No. 21 on the Billboard 200 albums chart on its release, selling around 15,000 copies in the United States in its first week. It also debuted at No. 1 on Billboards Bluegrass Albums, and No. 2 on the Folk Albums chart. The album has sold 104,000 copies in the United States as of August 2015.

Personnel

Edie Brickell – vocals
Steve Martin – 5-string banjo, vocalsAdditional musicians'
Peter Asher – percussion, acoustic guitar
Thomas Fetherstonhaugh – choir vocals
Mike Guggino – mandolin, background vocals
Sean Hill – choir vocals
Stephen Hilton – synthesisers, electronic percussion
Charles Humphrey – double bass
Patrick Kiernan – violin
Perry Montague Mason – violin
Kate Musker – viola
Joseph Outtrim – choir vocals
Woody Platt – background vocals
Anthony Pleeth – cello
Matt Rollings – accordion, Fender Rhodes, piano, Wurlitzer
Jeff Alan Ross – electric guitar
Nicky Sanders – fiddle
Noah Scoffield – choir vocals
Graham Sharp – background vocals
Esperanza Spalding – bass, double bass
Aaron Sterling – cajón, percussion, drums
Waddy Wachtel – acoustic and electric guitars
Ian Walker – bass, double bass
Sara Watkins – fiddle 
Sean Watkins – acoustic guitar
Stacy Watton – double bass
The Webb Sisters – background vocals
Geoff Zanelli – arranger, string arranger, dulcitone

Music video 

"Love Has Come for You" was made into a lyric video and published on Steve Martin's website.

Charts

References 

2013 albums
Steve Martin albums
Edie Brickell albums
Albums produced by Peter Asher
Collaborative albums
Rounder Records albums
Country albums by American artists
Bluegrass albums